Karnali Lok Sanskriti is a 1971 Nepali language collection of research in a form of book about the Karnali region, which lies on the western part of Nepal. It was written by a group of writers and scholars namely Pradeep Rimal, Chudamani Bandhu, Bihari Krishna Shrestha, Sthirjunga Bahadur Singh and Satya Mohan Joshi. The book has five volumes each describing history, geography, society, language, and literature of the Karnali region. The book was awarded Madan Puraskar in 2028 BS (1971). The book is considered a pioneer study about the Karnali region.

Background
After publishing Hamro Lok Sanskriti, Satyamohan Joshi was given the post of director in the cultural department of Nepal government. While in office, Joshi formed a panel of experts and conducted a field survey of Karnali region which lasted for six months. This book is a collection of findings of their works.

Synopsis
The book has five volumes. The volumes are:

 Itihas. The first volume of the set, written by Satya Mohan Joshi, deals with the history of Karnali region.
 Bhaugolik Drishtikon: The second volume deals with the geography. It was written by Sthirjunga Bahadur Singh.
 Jana Jiban: The third volume deals with the anthropology and was written by Bihari Krishna Shrestha.
 Bhasa: The fourth volume deals with the language and literature of Karnali. It was written by Chundamani Bandhu.
 Sahitya, Sangeet, Kala: The fifth volume deals with the culture, festivals and folk songs of Karnali. It was written by Pradeep Rimal.

Awards
The book won Madan Puraskar in 2028 BS.The prize was equally divided among the authors.

See also 

 Hamro Lok Sanskriti
 Mahakavi Devkota
 Limbuwanko Etihasik Dastavej Sangraha

References

Nepalese books
Nepali-language books
Madan Puraskar-winning works
Nepalese non-fiction books